Baily is a surname, a variant of Bailey. Notable people with the surname include:

Bernard Baily (1916–1996), American comic book artist
Christina Baily (born 1981), English actress
Cyril Baily (1880–1924), English cricketer
Eddie Baily (1925–2010), English footballer
Edward Baily (1852–1941), English cricketer
Edward Hodges Baily (1788–1867), English sculptor
Francis Baily (1774–1844), English astronomer
Gavin Baily (born 1971), English artist, one half of Corby & Baily
Jaime Bayly (born 1965), Peruvian journalist and television personality
Kirk Baily (1963–2022), American actor
Laurence Richardson Baily (1815–1887), English marine insurance specialist
Martin Neil Baily, American economist
Thomas Baily (c. 1525–1591), English Catholic clergyman
William Hellier Baily (1819–1888), English palaeontologist

See also
Bailey (surname)

English-language surnames
Occupational surnames
English-language occupational surnames